Orlík may refer to:

Orlík nad Vltavou, a municipality and village in the Czech Republic
Orlík Reservoir
Orlík Castle
11339 Orlík, an asteroid
Orlík (band), a former Czech band
Orlik (armoured train)

People
Emil Orlík (1870–1932), Czech painter, etcher and lithographer

See also
Orlik (disambiguation) (equivalent word in Polish and other Slavic languages)
Warsztaty Szybowcowe Orlik